Jeffco or JeffCo may refer to:

Jefferson County, Colorado
Jefferson County, Missouri transit (JeffCo Express)
Jefferson College (disambiguation), multiple schools